The East European vole (Microtus mystacinus) is a species of vole (rodent) in the family Cricetidae.

Distribution and habitat
It is found in Albania, Bulgaria, Finland, Greece, Iran, Svalbard (accidentally introduced), North Macedonia, Romania, Russia, Serbia and Montenegro, Slovakia, Turkey, Ukraine and Norway.

Taxonomy
On Svalbard, they were first discovered in 1960 in the Grumantbyen area, and were thought to be the common vole until a genetic analysis correctly identified them in 1990.

References 

Microtus
Vole, Southern
Mammals described in 1908
Taxonomy articles created by Polbot
Taxobox binomials not recognized by IUCN